Kamo (Ma, Nyii Ma) is a Savannas language of Gombe State, eastern Nigeria. Their original settlement was on Kamo Hill, but it was abandoned as the speakers gradually moved down into the plains during the 20th century.

References

Waja languages
Languages of Nigeria